In mathematics, the Drinfeld upper half plane is a rigid analytic space analogous to the usual upper half plane for function fields, introduced by . 
It is defined to be P1(C)\P1(F∞), where F is a function field of a curve over a finite field, F∞ its completion at ∞, and C the completion of the algebraic closure of F∞.

The analogy with the usual upper half plane arises from the fact that the global function field F is analogous to the rational numbers Q. Then, F∞ is the real numbers R and the algebraic closure of F∞ is the complex numbers C (which are already complete). Finally, P1(C) is the Riemann sphere, so P1(C)\P1(R) is the upper half plane together with the lower half plane.

References

Automorphic forms